This is a list of over-the-top streaming services owned and operated by professional wrestling promotions.

Active

Defunct

See also
List of professional wrestling websites
List of professional wrestling television series

References

Streaming